The 1991 World Table Tennis Championships women's doubles was the 40th edition of the women's doubles championship.
Chen Zihe and Gao Jun defeated Deng Yaping and Qiao Hong in the final by three sets to one.

Results

See also
List of World Table Tennis Championships medalists

References

-
World